Ray H. Watson (July 23, 1923 – May 18, 2004) was an American football coach.  He served as the head football coach at the West Virginia University Institute of Technology in Montgomery, West Virginia.  He held that position for three seasons, from 1957 until 1959.  His coaching record at West Virginia Tech was 16–8–2.

References

2004 deaths
1923 births
Glenville State Pioneers football players
West Virginia Mountaineers football coaches
West Virginia Tech Golden Bears football coaches
High school baseball coaches in the United States
High school basketball coaches in West Virginia
High school football coaches in West Virginia
Bethany College (West Virginia) alumni
People from Olyphant, Pennsylvania
People from Weston, West Virginia
Players of American football from West Virginia